What's on Your Mind may refer to:

 "What's on Your Mind" (George Benson song), 1981
 "What's on Your Mind (Pure Energy)", 1988 song by Information Society
 "What's on Your Mind?", 1978 song by Ace Frehley from Ace Frehley
 "What's on Your Mind?", 2019 song by Alessia Cara from This Summer
 "What's on Your Mind, 1979 song by John Denver from John Denver